Senator Jacobs may refer to:

Denny Jacobs (born 1937), Illinois State Senate
Gilda Jacobs (born 1949), Michigan State Senate
John C. Jacobs (1838–1894), New York State Senate
Michael A. Jacobs (1860–1936), Wisconsin State Senate
Mike Jacobs (Illinois politician) (born 1960), Illinois State Senate
Nancy Jacobs (born 1951), Maryland State Senate
William H. Jacobs (1831–1882), Wisconsin State Senate
Ken Jacob (born 1949), Missouri State Senate